Ann Lamont (née Huntress) is an American venture capitalist and the First Lady of Connecticut, as the wife of Governor of Connecticut Ned Lamont.

Early life and career 
Lamont was born in Whitefish Bay, Wisconsin, to Betsy Ann (née Whiteside) and Carroll B. Huntress, Jr. She received a bachelor's degree in political science from Stanford University in 1979.

Lamont is a founder and managing partner at Oak HC/FT. In 2006, the New York Times described her as "one of the most successful women ever in the lofty realm of venture capital." In 2007, she was named number 50 in Forbes Midas List.

Personal life
Lamont was married on September 10, 1983, to businessman Ned Lamont. They reside in Greenwich and have three children: Emily, Lindsay, and Teddy.

References

External links

 First Lady Annie Lamont 
 Profile on Forbes

American venture capitalists
Businesspeople from Greenwich, Connecticut
First Ladies and Gentlemen of Connecticut
Living people
a
People from Whitefish Bay, Wisconsin
Stanford University alumni
Year of birth missing (living people)